Mitja Nikolić Smrdelj (born 24 February 1991) is a Slovenian professional basketball player for Derthona Basket of the Lega Basket Serie A. He also represented the Slovenian national basketball team. He is a 2.00 m tall small forward.

Nikolić spent the 2020-21 season with  Remer Treviglio of the Serie A2. He averaged 13.4 points, 5.0 rebounds, and 3.4 assists per game. On September 24, 2021, Nikolić signed with Scaligera Basket Verona.

Personal life
Nikolić father was a basketball player, played for Postojna, and was an assistant coach of Slovenia national basketball team from 2004 to 2006. His younger brother Aleksej plays for KK Partizan.

International career
He represented Slovenia at the 2015 EuroBasket where they were eliminated by Latvia in eighth finals.

References

External links
 Union Olimpija Profile
 Eurobasket.com profile

1991 births
Living people
ABA League players
KK Olimpija players
People from Postojna
Power forwards (basketball)
Slovenian men's basketball players
Slovenian expatriate basketball people in the Czech Republic
Slovenian people of Serbian descent
Small forwards
Helios Suns players
Slovenian expatriate basketball people in Italy